Cheung Sheung is a village of in the Sai Kung North area of Tai Po District, Hong Kong.

Administration
Cheung Sheung is a recognized village under the New Territories Small House Policy.

History
Cheung Sheung Plateau was the site of several villages with schools during the peak era of the area, in the 1950s-1960s. Villagers moved to urban areas in the 1970s.

Features
Cheung Sheung is the site of the former Pok Oi Public School.

The Cheung Sheung Campsite is managed by the Agriculture, Fisheries and Conservation Department.

A store is open in the area during holidays.

Access
Cheung Sheung is located along Section 3 of the MacLehose Trail and the Cheung Sheung Country Trail.

References

External links

 Delineation of area of existing village Cheung Sheung (Sai Kung North) for election of resident representative (2019 to 2022)
 Cheung Sheung Village at gwulo.com

Villages in Tai Po District, Hong Kong
Sai Kung North